Sveadahl is an unincorporated community located in Adrian Township, Watonwan County, Minnesota, United States. The elevation is 1,073 feet.

History
A post office called Sveadahl was established in 1892, and remained in operation until 1907. Sveadahl is a name derived from Swedish meaning "Swedish valley".

References

Unincorporated communities in Watonwan County, Minnesota
Unincorporated communities in Minnesota